Kingu, also spelled Qingu (d kin-gu), was a god in Babylonian mythology, and the son of the gods Abzu and Tiamat. After the murder of his father, Abzu, he served as the consort of his mother, Tiamat, who wanted to establish him as ruler and leader of all gods before she was killed by Marduk.  Tiamat gave Kingu the Tablet of Destinies, which he wore as a breastplate and which gave him great power. She placed him as the general of her army.  However, like Tiamat, Kingu was eventually killed by Marduk. Marduk mixed Kingu's blood with earth and used the clay to mold the first human beings, while Tiamat's body created the earth and the skies.

See also
Enûma Elish
Geshtu-E
Pangu
Purusha
Ymir

References

Sources

External links
The Enuma Elish  translated by N. K. Sandars

Mesopotamian gods
Characters in the Enūma Eliš
Offspring of Tiamat
Killed deities